On July 29, the 2006 Tajikistan earthquake hit the Khatlon region of Tajikistan. The earthquake doublet killed three people and injured 19.

Poor water and sanitation posed an ongoing risk to health, as did malaria, given its prevalence in the region and the fact that some people sleep outdoors without mosquito nets. Damaged roofs made from asbestos posed additional risks to health.

Following an initial assessment mission of the earthquake affected areas on 29 July by the Minister for Emergency Situations, a second joint mission followed on 1 August, led by the Deputy Prime Minister and including the UN Country Team, WHO and humanitarian partners. WHO, in collaboration with the Ministry of Health, immediately activated other UN and international agencies and NGOs in response to the disaster.

To date, more than ten health partners, including NGOs, UN and International agencies have worked together to provide 50,000 water purification tablets, 86 tents and essential household items, mosquito nets, soap, buckets and high energy biscuits and to ensure basic drugs and WHO has donated 1 NEHKit to support local health authorities in ensuring essential medications are available for affected communities and forwarded drug donation guidelines.

Funding has been received from ECHO since January 2006, in support of WHO's work to 'strengthen and enhance the coordination of humanitarian health programmes' in Tajikistan.

See also
List of earthquakes in 2006
List of earthquakes in Tajikistan

References

External links
M5.6 - Hindu Kush region, Afghanistan – United States Geological Survey

2006 earthquakes
2006 in Tajikistan 
2006 disasters in Tajikistan
2006 Tajikistan
July 2006 events in Asia